Events from the year 1798 in Sweden

Incumbents
 Monarch – Gustav IV Adolf

Events

 - The Royal Dramatic Theatre is granted monopoly of professional dramatic performances within the city borders of Stockholm, and all other theaters in Stockholm, notably the Stenborg Theatre, is closed down (the monopoly is not dissolved until 1842).
 - Married business women are given legal majority and juridical responsibility within the affairs of their business enterprise, despite being otherwise under guardianship of their spouse.

Births

 9 March – Mathilda Berwald, concert singer  (died 1877)
 16 June – Johan Henrik Thomander
  Lovisa Charlotta Borgman, violinist (died 1884)
 Gustafva Röhl, educator (died 1848)

Deaths

 20 January - Maria Kristina Kiellström, role model of Ulla Winblad  (born 1744)
 Ulrika Fredrika Bremer, shipowner (born 1746)
 Anna Maria Hjärne, courtier (born 1718)

References

 
Years of the 18th century in Sweden
Sweden